Sar Tang is a village in Chelo Rural District, Chelo District, Andika County, Khuzestan Province, Iran. At the 2006 census, its population was 280, in 46 families.

References 

Populated places in Andika County